County Mayo was a constituency represented in the Irish House of Commons from 1611 to 1800. Between 1725 and 1793, under the Penal Laws, Catholics and those married to Catholics could not vote.

Members of Parliament
 1585 Thomas Williams and John Browne
 1613–1614 Tiobóid na Long Bourke, 1st Viscount Mayo and Sir Thomas Burke 
 1634–1635 Sir Thomas Bourke and Sir Roger O'Shaunessy 
 1639–1649 Sir Theobald Bourke, Baronet, and Thomas Bourke 
 1658 Sir Thomas Sadlier
 1661 Sir Arthur Gore and Sir James Cuffe

1689–1801

Notes

References

Historic constituencies in County Mayo
Constituencies of the Parliament of Ireland (pre-1801)
1611 establishments in Ireland
1800 disestablishments in Ireland
Constituencies established in 1611
Constituencies disestablished in 1800